History of Swear Words is an American documentary series hosted by Nicolas Cage. The series was released on January 5, 2021, on Netflix.

Premise
Hosted by Nicolas Cage, the unscripted series explores the History of Swear Words through interviews with experts in etymology, popular culture, history and entertainment, with each episode diving into the origins, usage and cultural impact of specific curse words: fuck, shit, bitch, dick, pussy and damn.

Cast
 Nicolas Cage as Host
 Jess Harnell as Grandpa

Entertainers
 Sarah Silverman
 Nick Offerman
 Nikki Glaser
 Patti Harrison
 Open Mike Eagle
 Joel Kim Booster
 DeRay Davis
 London Hughes
 Jim Jefferies
 Zainab Johnson
 Baron Vaughn
 Isiah Whitlock Jr.

Experts
 Benjamin K. Bergen – Professor of Cognitive science at the University of California, San Diego
 Anne H. Charity Hudley – Linguist, Professor of African-American English at the University of California, Santa Barbara
 Mireille Miller-Young – Professor of Women's studies at the University of California, Santa Barbara
 Elvis Mitchell – Film critic
 Melissa Mohr – Author of Holy Sh*t: A Brief History of Swearing
 Kory Stamper – Author of Word by Word: The Secret Life of Dictionaries, Lexicographer, and former editor for Merriam-Webster

Episodes

Production
On December 9, 2020, it was announced that Nicolas Cage would host an unscripted six-episode series about the history of swear words for Netflix.

The series has been produced by Bellamie Blackstone, Mike Farah, Joe Farrell, and Beth Belew for Funny or Die, with Brien Meagher and Rhett Bachner for Industrial Media's B17 Entertainment respectively. Blackstone will also serve as the series showrunner.

Reception 
Richard Roeper of Chicago Sun-Times gave the series 3 out of 4 stars and described it as "a cheeky, entertaining and legitimately educational look at the etymology of the most common curse words."

On Rotten Tomatoes, the series holds an approval rating of 70% based on 27 reviews, with an average rating of 6.40/10. The website's critics consensus reads, "Brevity may be the soul of wit, but digging a little deeper could only help History of Swear Words — a show that almost lives up to its name and host, but falls a little f-king short." On Metacritic, it has a weighted average score of 62 out of 100 based on 14 reviews, indicating "generally favorable reviews".

See also
 Seven dirty words

References

External links
 
 
 

Netflix original documentary television series
2020s American documentary television series
2021 American television series debuts
English-language Netflix original programming
Television series by Funny or Die
Works about profanity